Rabbi Yaakov Koppel Altenkunshtadt (1765 – 1837), also known as Reb Koppel Charif for his sharp (Hebrew: חריף) intellect, was one of the leading Orthodox rabbis of Hungary in the first half of the nineteenth century. A peer of the famed Moses Sofer of Pressburg, Koppel Charif presided over what was at one time the largest and most prestigious yeshiva in Hungary.

Early years 
He was born in the city of Altenkunstadt, in Bavaria, Germany in 1765. the son of the scholar Tzvi Hirsh Altenkunshtadt.

In 1781 he went to study under Yechezkel Landau of Prague, author of Noda biYehudah, During his time in Fiurda, his parents passed away.

He lived in Prague from 1783 to 1786. In 1786 he became engaged to Raizel Pessels, the daughter of the scholar and merchant Avrohom Pessels of Shtampfen, Hungary. They were married in 1788.

He studied in Stampfen for a few months and then became the rabbi in Karlburg where 1789 until 1791 when he became rabbi of Verbau, Hungary.

Altenkunshtadt was rabbi of Verbau for 45 years. His yeshivah usually held about 150 students at a time.

He died 19 December 1837.

References 

 C. (Yaakov Koppel) Duschinsky, Toldos Yaakov, The life and times of the Gaon Rebbi Koppel Charif of blessed and righteous memory (London: Rephoel Mazin and partners, 1918) in Hebrew. Copyright 2018 in English. Duschinsky, Yaakov Koppel. Translated by Dovid Honig. Toldos Yaakov, The Life and Times of the Gaon Rav Koppel Charif (Jerusalem: Torah Im Derech Eretz Society, 2018). 
 Rav Shlomo Zalman Sonnenfeld, Guardian of Jerusalem (Brooklyn, NY: Mesorah Publications, 1983).

1765 births
1837 deaths
Hungarian people of German descent
Talmudists
18th-century Hungarian rabbis
18th-century German rabbis
19th-century Hungarian rabbis